Brun may refer to:

People
 Brun (surname)
 Brun (given name)
 Brun I of Saxony (c. 830/840–880)
 Brun of Querfurt (c. 974–1009), missionary archbishop and martyr
 Brun I, Count of Brunswick (c. 975–c. 1010)

Other
 Brun (grape), another name for the French wine grape Téoulier
 Brun Motorsport, a Swiss sports car team
 Mont Brun, a mountain in Switzerland
 River Brun, a river in eastern Lancashire, England
 Brun, former name of Akner, Syunik, Armenia, a village

See also
 Bruno (disambiguation)
 Bruin (disambiguation)
 Bruun
 Brunskill